Sturnia is a genus of Asian birds in the family Sturnidae. It is sometimes merged with Sturnus.

Species
The old genus' placement with the starlings was found to be polyphyletic, resulting in changes in the placement. A 2008 study places the following species within this genus:

Extant species

Former taxonomic treatments have included:
 White-faced starling, Sturnia albofrontata.
 Daurian starling, Sturnia sturnina.
 Chestnut-cheeked starling, Sturnia philippensis.

If the first of these is included, it seems highly warranted to include in Sturnia also the monotypic genera Leucopsar (Bali myna) and Fregilupus (hoopoe starling), and perhaps the enigmatic Necropsar (Rodrigues starling). On the other hand, if these distinct genera are maintained, the white-faced starling would then receive its own genus, Sturnornis.

The other two would better be dealt with by resurrecting Agropsar, either as a distinct genus or as a subgenus of Gracupica, which otherwise includes the black-collared starling ("Sturnus" nigricollis) and pied mynas ("Gracupica sp." ); these four form a robust and ancient group of two sister species that is perhaps even closer to the wattled starling (Creatophpora cinerea) than to the actual genus Sturnus. Their similarity to Sturnia proper is probably simply a symplesiomorphy.

References

 
Sturnidae
Bird genera
Taxa named by René Lesson